The Long March 7, or Chang Zheng 7 in pinyin, abbreviated LM-7 for export or CZ-7 within China, originally Long March 2F/H or Chang Zheng 2F/H, nicknamed Bingjian, is a Chinese liquid-fuelled launch vehicle of the Long March family, developed by the China Aerospace Science and Technology Corporation (CAST). It made its inaugural flight on 25 June 2016.

Designed as a replacement of the Long March 2F, Long March 7 and its variants are expected to be the workhorse of the fleet, projected to account for around 70% of all Chinese launches. Long March 7 will also play a critical role in the Chinese Space Station. It was used to launch the Tianzhou robotic cargo spacecraft, and will eventually replace the Long March 2F as China's crew-rated launch vehicle in the future.

Since 2020, in addition to the base Long March 7 configuration, there is the Long March 7A (CZ-7A etc.) variant which differs from the base CZ-7 by the addition of a liquid hydrogen-liquid oxygen third stage inherited from the third stage of the Long March 3B.

History 
The Long March 7 project started in 2008 with the formation of the development team within the traditional designer of space launch vehicles, CALT. With the acquisition of the RD-120 technology and development of the YF-100 and YF-115 engines, the original plan was to re-engine the Long March 2F. The Long March 2F/H, as it would have been called, would "just" switch from N2O4 / UDMH to a LOX / kerosene propellant and improved thrust engines to offer better performance. But the switch resulted in a cascade of changes that increased the project complexity significantly.

At the same time, the original Long March 5 project was expected to include heavy, medium and light versions. Since the Long March 2F/H and the medium Long March 5 had significant overlaps, it was decided to merge both projects. This way, the high reliability and flight legacy components and technologies of the Long March 2F were merged with the new technologies developed for the Long March 5. Although finished nearly at the same time, the Long March 6 was a completely separate product developed by a young team within SAST. As such, it shares little more than tank diameters and propulsion with the LM-5 and LM7, but does cover the range of payloads between the medium Long March 7 and the very light Long March 11.

In 2010, the project name was changed officially to Long March 7. According to the project deputy manager, Zhang Tao, the project required eleven new major technologies. But the innovation was not only at the product level, but one at the process itself. This was, according to the project manager, Wang Xiaojun, the first time the whole process was developed in digital 3D, using computer-aided design directly to computer-aided manufacturing.

The inaugural flight was successfully performed on 25 June 2016, at 12:00 UTC from the Wenchang, LC-2 launch pad. It launched in the LM-7 configuration with the addition of the simultaneously debuting Yuanzheng-1A upper stage; the flight performed its multi-orbit mission successfully.

Design 
The Long March 7 is the medium-lift variant of a new generation rocket family that includes the heavier-lift Long March 5 and the small-mid cargo Long March 6. The structure is based on the reliable, man-rated Long March 2F launch vehicle. It inherited the 3.35 m-diameter core stage and 2.25 m-diameter liquid rocket boosters. Where the earlier Long March 2 rocket family used expensive and dangerous  / UDMH propellants, the Long March 7 uses LOX and kerosene. The engines are shared with the Long March 5 and 6. The goal was to build a more cost-effective and less hazardous rocket family to replace today's Long March 2 and eventually the Long March 3.

Stages 
The Long March 7 inherits the modular stages of the original Long March 5 project. As such, its first stage is the same module as the LM-5 boosters. It also shares tank diameters and engines with the Long March 6, but the design groups were completely different. The LM-5 and LM-7 were developed by China Academy of Launch Vehicle Technology (CALT), while the LM-6 was done by Shanghai Academy of Spaceflight Technology (SAST). Even the avionics are different.

The basic Long March 7 can be optimized by varying the number of boosters or enhanced by the addition of upper stages. These stages allow more mission flexibility, like direct injection to higher orbits or multiple orbit deployment. They can also increase the performance significantly.

Boosters 
The Long March 7 can use 0, 2 or 4 boosters using RP-1 / LOX propellant. They are powered by a single oxidizer-rich staged combustion YF-100 engine. Each module has its own single axis thrust vector control, and thus it required a special design in the control systems of the rocket to coordinate all the rocket's nozzles. A Long March 7 rocket booster created a fireball visible from portions of Utah, Nevada, Colorado, Idaho and California on the evening of 27 July 2016; its disintegration was widely reported on social media, and the uncontrolled re-entry of such a five-ton object was regarded as a rare event.

First stage 
The first stage has  diameter tanks carrying RP-1/LOX propellant. It is powered by two YF-100 engines, sharing the same propulsion elements as the boosters, only that for the first stage the engines can gimbal in two axes. Also, this first stage is the same basic module as the Long March 5 boosters. The diameter was designed for land transport and as such, it will be able to launch from all the Chinese launch sites. This is a critical difference to the LM-5 that requires water transport for its core stages. While it shares diameter and engines with the Long March 6 first stage, the development was completely separated and done by different groups.

Second stage 
The second stage also shares the first  diameter tanks and propellant. It is powered by four oxidizer-rich staged combustion RP-1/LOX YF-115 engines. Two are fixed and two can gimbal in two axis. While it shares engines with the Long March 6 second stage, the development were completely separated and done by different groups.

Optional stages

Yuanzheng-1A 
It can use the Yuanzheng-1A upper stage to increase payload to higher energy orbits and enable multiple ignition missions. Particularly, allows direct injection to SSO orbits. The inaugural flight successfully used this upper stage to deliver multiple payloads to different orbits.

Hydrogen stage 
The Long March 7 is expected to be enhanced by a high-energy liquid hydrogen and liquid oxygen stage. That would be a 25% increase with respect to the previously most powerful Chinese launcher, the Long March 3B, but well below the Long March 5. The Long March 7A variant, active since March 2020, accomplishes just this enhancement; it is made of the initial two stages of Long March 7, with a third stage powered by liquid hydrogen and liquid oxygen.

In the 2013 presentation of variations, a hydrogen-powered stage was also used as a second stage. It was not clear if it would be the same stage used as the second stage or a different stage. In both cases (second and third stage) they would be powered by the YF-75 or the YF-75D.

Solid boosters 
The 2013 presentation of the variation also proposed smaller  diameter solid boosters as a cheaper option for smaller payloads.

Avionics 
After the inaugural flight, Song Zhengyu, Deputy Chief Control Systems Designer for the Long March 7 project, stated that the flight had proven indigenous avionics. They had to work with the local industry to develop space rated dual processor PLCs. It was also stated that the real-time operating system was also an indigenous development. The general design was based on a distributed architecture to enable scalability and fault tolerance. This avionics would be the base for most future developments and had been designed with reusability in mind.

2013 proposed variations 
In a paper published on the Manned Spaceflight publication of the CMSEO, the Long March 7 was presented as a family of launch vehicles. The variations would be codified by a two number plus variable letters code, and a CZ-7 prefix in the form CZ-7##. The first digit would mean the number of stages in the core, which could be either 2 or 3. The second number would mean the number of boosters, which could be 0, 2 or 4, with an S appended if the boosters were of solid type. There was also proposed an alternative second stage powered by the LH/LOX propellant and dual YF-75 engines would be identified by appending an (HO) to the designation. At last, it could have an additional upper stage, later identified as the Yuanzheng-1A, that would be identified by appending to the designation /SM.

For example, the version that debuted was codified under this nomenclature as the CZ-724/SM, since it had two RP-1/LOX core stages, four liquid boosters and was enhanced by the Yuanzheng-1A stage. A CZ-720 would have two RP-1/LOX stages and no boosters. A CZ-724S(HO) would have a RP-1/LOX first stage, a LH/LOX second stage and four solid boosters. A CZ-732 would have two RP-1/LOX stages, a LH/LOX third stage, and two liquid boosters. The paper expected the following performance from certain versions.

The paper also presented the propulsion options for each stage. The RP-1/LOX second stage had only two YF-115 instead of the normal four, when used in the version with no boosters. It might have implied a different smaller upper stage or an under filled one.

CZ-7A variant 
Since 2020, the base two-stage CZ-7 configuration has been supplemented by the CZ-7A variant. (Note that the 7A variant is similar to the CZ-73X variants first proposed in 2013; see previous subsection).

The maiden CZ-7A was launched on 16 March 2020 at 13:34 UTC from Wenchang Satellite Launch Center on Hainan island. Two hours after launch, state news sources announced that the flight ended in failure; no causes for the failure were indicated initially. Launch preparations for the maiden flight continued in the weeks prior to launch despite measures taken to combat the spread of the COVID-19 virus in China. In 2021, some observers speculated, based on unconfirmed Chinese Baidu posts, that the failure of the CZ-7A's maiden flight was caused by the loss of pressurization in one of its four boosters just prior to main engine cutoff and the staging of the first stage (about 168 seconds into the flight). 

The second CZ-7A launched successfully from Wenchang on 11 March 2021. The launch vehicle carried the Shiyan-9 satellite to test new technologies such as space environmental monitoring, according to the China Aerospace Science and Technology Corporation (CASC).

Launch Statistics

List of launches

References 

Long March (rocket family)
Vehicles introduced in 2016
2016 in China
2016 in technology